Laurence (Laurie) Edward Montgomery (August 17, 1936 – May 4, 2019) was a Canadian politician, who served as a Liberal Party Member of the Legislative Assembly in the Nova Scotia House of Assembly from 1998 to 1999, representing the electoral district of Annapolis.

Political career
Montgomery entered provincial politics in the 1998 provincial election, defeating his Progressive Conservative opponent by 250 votes. Montgomery did not run again in the 1999 provincial election.
Montgomery died on May 4, 2019 in Middleton, Nova Scotia 
Flags of the Provincial House were flown at half-mast on May 8, 2019 in honour of the former MLA.

Electoral record

|-

|Liberal
|Laurie Montgomery
|align="right"|3448
|align="right"|37.0
|align="right"|
|-

|Progressive Conservative
|Basil Stewart
|align="right"|3198
|align="right"|34.3
|align="right"|
|-

|New Democratic Party
|John Kinsella
|align="right"|2468
|align="right"|26.5
|align="right"|
|-

|Independent
|Bob Mann
|align="right"|215
|align="right"|2.3
|align="right"|
|}

References

1936 births
2019 deaths
Nova Scotia Liberal Party MLAs
People from Weyburn